Die Dame und der Blinde is an East German film. It was released in 1959.

External links
 

1959 films
East German films
Television in East Germany
German television films
1950s German-language films
German-language television shows